Benjamin Michaelson (born November 13, 1981) is a swimmer hailing from Seymour, Connecticut. He attended Seymour High School, later continuing his education and career at Southern Connecticut State University under head coach Timothy Quill and assistant coach CJ Moran. After college, he continued swimming at the SoNoCo swim club out of SCSU and later Club Wolverine. In 2003 he was ranked 11th in the world for the men's 100 long course meter fly, his time of 52.76 tied him for third on the all-time top times for Americans. In 2004, he placed 3rd in the 100 m fly behind Ian Crocker and Michael Phelps at the US Olympic Trials. He officially retired after in the latter months 2005, citing a need to move on with his life.

Top times
 50 y freestyle- 19.4 (NCAA Division II record)
 100 y freestyle- 43.33 (NCAA Division II record)
 100 y fly- 45.60 (NCAA Division II record)
 50 m free- 23.41
 100 m free- 51.53
 100 m fly- 52.76

Awards
 2003 NCAA Division II swimmer of the year
 2003 Connecticut SportsWriters Alliance Bill Lee Award
 2002 and 2003 Metropolitan Conference Swimmer of the Year

References

External links
 CT SWIM article
 Swiminfo on Michaelson
 SoNoCo swim club

American male swimmers
Living people
People from Seymour, Connecticut
Swimmers at the 2003 Pan American Games
1981 births
Southern Connecticut State University alumni
College men's swimmers in the United States
Sportspeople from New Haven County, Connecticut
Swimmers from Connecticut
Pan American Games gold medalists for the United States
Pan American Games medalists in swimming
Medalists at the 2003 Pan American Games